Group A of the 2023 Africa Cup of Nations qualification tournament is one of the twelve groups that will decide the two teams that shall qualify for the 2023 Africa Cup of Nations. The group consists of four teams: Nigeria, Sierra Leone, Guinea-Bissau and São Tomé and Príncipe.

The teams shall play against each other in a home-and-away round-robin format, between 9 June 2022 and September 2023.

Standings

Matches

Goalscorers

Group A

References